The Medal "For the Victory Over Germany in the Great Patriotic War 1941–1945" was a military decoration of the Soviet Union established on May 9, 1945, by decree of the Presidium of the Supreme Soviet of the USSR to denote military participation in the victory of the Soviet armed forces over Nazi Germany in the Great Patriotic War.

Medal statute 
The Medal "For the Victory over Germany in the Great Patriotic War 1941–1945" was awarded to all military and civilian personnel of the Red Army, of the Navy and of the troops of the NKVD who were directly involved on the different fronts of World War II and ensured victory through their work in the various military districts; to all military and civilian personnel who served during the Great Patriotic War in the ranks of the Red Army, of the Navy or of the NKVD destruction battalions, but who were released from military service due to injury or illness, as well as those transferred by decision of the state or Party organizations to tasks outside of the armed forces.

Award of the medal was made on behalf of the Presidium of the Supreme Soviet of the USSR on the basis of documents attesting to actual participation in the Great Patriotic War issued by unit commanders, the chiefs of military medical establishments or the executive committees of regional or city Soviets.  Serving military personnel received the medal from their unit commander, retirees from military service received the medal from a regional, municipal or district military commissioner in the recipient's community. 

The Medal "For the Victory over Germany in the Great Patriotic War 1941–1945" was worn on the left side of the chest and in the presence of other awards of the USSR, was located immediately after the Medal "For the Defence of the Soviet Transarctic".  If worn in the presence of Orders or medals of the Russian Federation, the latter have precedence.

Medal description 
The Medal "For the Victory over Germany in the Great Patriotic War 1941–1945" was a 32mm in diameter circular brass medal with a raised rim on both sides. On its obverse, the left profile bust of Joseph Stalin in the uniform of a Marshal of the Soviet Union, along the upper circumference of the medal, the relief inscription "OUR CAUSE IS RIGHTEOUS", along the lower circumference of the medal, the relief inscription "WE ARE VICTORIOUS".  On the reverse, at the bottom, a small five pointed star, along the medal circumference, the relief inscription "FOR VICTORY OVER GERMANY", in the center, the relief inscription on three rows "IN THE GREAT PATRIOTIC WAR OF 1941–45.

The Medal "For the Victory over Germany in the Great Patriotic War 1941–1945" was secured by a ring through the medal suspension loop to a standard Soviet pentagonal mount covered by a 24mm wide silk moiré Ribbon of St. George.

Notable recipients 
The individuals below were all recipients of the Medal "For the Victory over Germany in the Great Patriotic War 1941–1945".

Soviets
Politician in charge of the defence of Leningrad, Andrei Alexandrovich Zhdanov
Marshal of the Soviet Union Konstantin Rokossovskiy
People's Artist of the USSR Yuri Vladimirovich Nikulin
Tank battalion commander Arseny Nikiforovich Semionov
Lieutenant Vsevolod Andreevich Bazhenov
Colonel Baurzhan Momyshuly
Lieutenant Colonel Fatyh Zaripovich Sharipov
Major Raul–Yuri Georgievich Ervier
Reichstag attacker Lieutenant Alexei Berest
Reichstag flag raiser Sergeant Meliton Varlamovich Kantaria
Reichstag flag raiser Sergeant Mikhail Alekseevich Yegorov
Lieutenant Vasil Uładzimiravič Bykaŭ
Admiral Filipp Sergeyevich Oktyabrskiy
Captain Mariya Ivanivna Dolina
Major Natalya Fyodorovna Meklin
Army General Yakov Grigorevich Kreizer
Admiral of the Fleet Alexei Ivanovich Sorokin
Lieutenant General Vasily Mikhaylovich Badanov
Artilleryman Rostislav Ivanovich Vovkushevsky
Marshal of Artillery Vasily Ivanovich Kazakov
Marshal of the Soviet Union Fyodor Ivanovich Tolbukhin
Lieutenant Colonel Petras Ciunis

Foreign nationals
General in command of the 1st Czechoslovak Army Corps, Ludvík Svoboda (Czechoslovakia)
Marshal of Poland Marian "Marek" Spychalski (Poland)
General and President Wojciech Witold Jaruzelski (Poland)
Brigadier General Mieczysław Cygan (Poland)
Sailor Asbjørn Edvin Sunde (Norway)
General Vasile Atanasiu (Romania)
Major Roland Paulze d'Ivoy de la Poype (France)
Lieutenant Colonel Pierre Pouyade (France)
Captain Ljubomir Milošević (Yugoslavia)
Joseph Beyrle (United States)

See also 
Great Patriotic War 1941–45
Joseph Stalin
Medal "For Valiant Labour in the Great Patriotic War 1941–1945"
Moscow Victory Parade of 1945
Operation Barbarossa
Ribbon of Saint George

References

External links 
 Legal Library of the USSR

Soviet campaign medals
Military awards and decorations of the Soviet Union
Military awards and decorations of Russia
Germany–Soviet Union relations
Awards established in 1945
1945 establishments in the Soviet Union